The Middle Eastern nation of Iraq competed at the 2012 Summer Olympics in London, held from 27 July to 12 August 2012. This was the nation's thirteenth appearance at the Olympics since its debut at the 1948 Summer Olympics in the same host city.

Before the Olympic Games started, FIFA banned Iraq from hosting qualifiers in the World Cup and in the Olympics for security concerns, and for having a player with two cards participating in a match against United Arab Emirates.

Iraq also competed for the first time in Olympics without receiving any sanctions, bans or suspensions, from the International Olympic Committee. The National Olympic Committee of Iraq sent a total of 8 athletes to the Games, 5 men and 3 women, to compete in 7 different sports. Most of them were awarded places in their respective sporting events under wild card entries and Tripartite Commission invitation. Wild card competitor Rand Al-Mashhadani became Iraq's first Olympic archer, after having reached the entry deadline for her event. Sprinter Dana Hussain, who had previously competed in Beijing, set the nation's historic record as the first Iraqi female flag bearer at the opening ceremony. Iraq, however, failed to win an Olympic medal since the 1960 Summer Olympics in Rome, where Abdul Wahid Aziz won the bronze for weightlifting.

Archery

Iraq has been given a wild card.

Athletics

Key
 Note – Ranks given for track events are within the athlete's heat only
 Q = Qualified for the next round
 q = Qualified for the next round as a fastest loser or, in field events, by position without achieving the qualifying target
 NR = National record
 N/A = Round not applicable for the event
 Bye = Athlete not required to compete in round

Men

Women

Boxing

Men

Shooting

Women

Swimming

Iraq has gained a "Universality place" from the FINA.

Men

Weightlifting

Iraq has qualified one weightlifter.

Wrestling

Iraq has been given a wild card.

Key
  - Victory by Fall.
  - Decision by Points - the loser with technical points.
  - Decision by Points - the loser without technical points.

Men's Greco-Roman

References

Nations at the 2012 Summer Olympics
2012
2012 in Iraqi sport